The Bellotron Incident is a Big Finish Productions audio drama featuring Lisa Bowerman as Bernice Summerfield, a character from the spin-off media based on the long-running British science fiction television series Doctor Who.

Plot 
On the primitive planet of Bellotron, Bernice finds herself caught up in the Sontaran/Rutan conflict. The war has started to endanger the Terran trade routes, but when the Captain of the battle cruiser Rites of Passage finds an energy signature of artificial origin on the primitive planet of Bellotron he is duty bound to call in the assistance of a qualified academic.

Confronted by savage predators, fiendish traps and the unexpected involvement of an opportunist thief, an unwilling Benny finds herself caught up in a conflict where neither side plays by the rules  and no-one is quite what they seem...

Cast
Bernice Summerfield - Lisa Bowerman
Irving Braxiatel - Miles Richardson
Joseph the Porter - Steven Wickham
Bev Tarrant - Louise Faulkner
Captain Patrick Quilby - Peter John
Commander Ryan - Karl Hansen

Trivia

Bev Tarrant previously appeared in the Doctor Who audio stories The Genocide Machine and Dust Breeding.

External links
Big Finish Productions - Professor Bernice Summerfield: The Bellotron Incident

Bernice Summerfield audio plays
Fiction set in the 27th century